The Luhan or Lugan (also known as Luhanka or Luganka) is a river in the Donbas region of Ukraine, a right tributary of the Seversky Donets, in the basin of the Don. The city of Luhansk, which stands where the river  flows into the Luhan, took its name from the river. The Luhan river rises in the eastern part of Horlivka in Donetsk Oblast.

References

 Географічна енциклопедія України: в 3-х томах / Редколегія: О. М. Маринич (відпов. ред.) та ін. — К.: «Українська радянська енциклопедія» імені М. П. Бажана, 1989.

Rivers of Donetsk Oblast
Rivers of Luhansk Oblast